Tropical Trouble is a 1936 British comedy film directed by Harry Hughes and starring Douglass Montgomery, Betty Ann Davies and Alfred Drayton. It was based on the novel Bunga-Bunga by Stephen King-Hall. A series of misunderstandings leads to a colonial governor's wife suspecting him of an affair with his assistant.

It was shot at Walton Studios.

Cast
 Douglass Montgomery as George Masterman
 Betty Ann Davies as Mary Masterman
 Alfred Drayton as Sir Monagu Thumpeter
 Natalie Hall as Louise van der Houten
 Sybil Grove as Lady Thumpeter
 Victor Stanley as Albert
 Gerald Barry as Sir Pomfrey Pogglethwaite
 Morris Harvey as Chief of the Bungs
 Marie Ault as Nonnie
 Vernon Harris as Martindale

References

Bibliography
 Sutton, David R. A chorus of raspberries: British film comedy 1929-1939. University of Exeter Press, 2000.

External links

1936 films
1936 comedy films
British comedy films
Films based on British novels
Films directed by Harry Hughes
Films shot at Nettlefold Studios
British black-and-white films
Films scored by Eric Spear
1930s English-language films
1930s British films